The 1978 Australia Day Honours were announced on 26 January 1978 by the Governor General of Australia, Sir Zelman Cowen.

The Australia Day Honours are the first of the two major annual honours lists, announced on Australia Day (26 January), with the other being the Queen's Birthday Honours which are announced on the second Monday in June.

Order of Australia

Knight (AK)

Companion (AC)

Officer (AO)

General Division

Military Division

Member (AM)

General Division

Military Division

Medal (OAM)

General Division

Military Division

References

1978 awards
Orders, decorations, and medals of Australia
1978 in Australia